Lilapur may refer to:

 Lilapur Kalan, Allahabad, Uttar Pradesh
 Lilapur, Pratapgarh, Uttar Pradesh
 Lilapur, Ahmadabad, Gujarat
 Lilapur, Rajkot, Gujarat
 Lilapur, Surendranagar, Gujarat